Lo Nga Ching is a retired professional wushu taolu athlete from Hong Kong. She is an eight-time medalist at the World Wushu Championships and is a two-time world champion. She also won a silver medal in women's changquan at the 2001 East Asian Games. After retiring, she married He Jing De.

References 

Hong Kong wushu practitioners
Living people
Wushu practitioners at the 1998 Asian Games
Wushu practitioners at the 2002 Asian Games
Year of birth missing (living people)